Barjac is the name of several communes in France:

 Barjac, Ariège, in the Ariège department
 Barjac, Gard, in the Gard department
 Barjac, Lozère, in the Lozère department